Phlegra parvula is a jumping spider species in the genus Phlegra that lives in Tanzania. The female was first described in 2000.

References

Endemic fauna of Tanzania
Fauna of Tanzania
Salticidae
Spiders of Africa
Taxa named by Wanda Wesołowska
Spiders described in 2000